Muhammad Taufik Hidayat (born 20 March 1993) is an Indonesian professional footballer who plays as a left-back for Liga 1 club PSIS Semarang.

Club career

PSIS Semarang
First professional club of Taufik Hidayat was PSIS Semarang. Since the first year, Taufik was often being the first choice of coach. In the "Sepak Bola Gajah" scandal in 2014, Taufik received a five-year ban on playing in the league and fined Rp 50 million. But then in 2017 through Letter Number 009/Kep/PK-PSSI/I/2017 dated January 10, 2017, status of Taufik together with 9 players and three officials restored by PSSI.

Bali United
On December 17, 2017, he signed a year contract with Liga 1 club Bali United. Taufik made his league debut on 3 June 2018 in a match against Madura United at the Gelora Bangkalan Stadium, Bangkalan.

PSM Makassar
On January 13, 2019, he signed contract with Liga 1 club PSM Makassar. Taufik made his league debut on 24 May 2019 in a match against Badak Lampung at the Andi Mattalatta Stadium, Makassar.

Arema F.C.
Taufik in 2020 signed for Arema to play in the 2020 Liga 1 (Indonesia) season. He made his league debut on 2 March 2020 in a match against TIRA-Persikabo at the Pakansari Stadium, Cibinong. This season was suspended on 27 March 2020 due to the COVID-19 pandemic. The season was abandoned and was declared void on 20 January 2021.

PSIM Yogyakarta
In 2021, Taufik Hidayat signed a contract with Indonesian Liga 2 club PSIM Yogyakarta. He made his league debut on 26 September in a 1–0 loss against PSCS Cilacap at the Manahan Stadium, Surakarta.

Return to PSIS Semarang
In 2022, Taufik Hidayat is back in PSIS Semarang uniform. The player from Sayung, Demak will wear the PSIS uniform in the second round of Liga 1 after yesterday strengthening PSIM Yogyakarta in the Liga 2 competition until the semifinals. Taufik made his league debut on 6 January 2022 in a match against Persija Jakarta at the Kapten I Wayan Dipta Stadium, Gianyar.

Honours

Club
PSIS Semarang
 Liga 2 third place (play-offs): 2017
PSM Makassar
 Piala Indonesia: 2019

References

External links
 Taufik Hidayat at Soccerway

1993 births
Living people
Indonesian footballers
People from Demak Regency
Sportspeople from Central Java
PSIS Semarang players
Bali United F.C. players
PSM Makassar players
Arema F.C. players
PSIM Yogyakarta players
Liga 2 (Indonesia) players
Liga 1 (Indonesia) players
Association football fullbacks